The 1975 Giro d'Italia was the 58th edition of the Giro d'Italia, one of cycling's Grand Tours. The Giro began in Milan on 17 May, and Stage 11 occurred on 28 May with a stage to Orvieto. The race finished at the Stelvio Pass on 7 June.

Stage 1
17 May 1975 — Milan to Fiorano Modenese,

Stage 2
18 May 1975 — Modena to Ancona,

Stage 3
19 May 1975 — Ancona to Prati di Tivo,

Stage 4
20 May 1975 — Teramo to Campobasso,

Stage 5
21 May 1975 — Campobasso to Bari,

Stage 6
22 May 1975 — Bari to Castrovillari,

Stage 7a
23 May 1975 — Castrovillari to Padula,

Stage 7b
23 May 1975 — Padula to Potenza,

Stage 8
24 May 1975 — Potenza to Sorrento,

Stage 9
25 May 1975 — Sorrento to Frosinone,

Stage 10
26 May 1975 — Frosinone to Tivoli,

Stage 11
27 May 1975 — Rome to Orvieto,

References

1975 Giro d'Italia
Giro d'Italia stages